Novosepyashevo (Yañı Säpäş) is a rural locality (a selo) and the administrative center of Ibrayevsky Selsoviet, Alsheyevsky District, Bashkortostan, Russia. The population was 283 as of 2010. There are 3 streets.

Geography 
Novosepyashevo is located 10 km east of Rayevsky (the district's administrative centre) by road. Linda is the nearest rural locality.

See also 
 Rozalia Sultangareeva- Bashkir folklorist, scientist.Folk songs-kubayrs performer.

References 

Rural localities in Alsheyevsky District